318 is the natural number following 317 and preceding 319.

In mathematics
318 is:
a sphenic number
a nontotient
the number of posets with 6 unlabeled elements

References

Integers